Lodewijk De Koninck (Hoogstraten, 30 October 1838 - Retie, 22 March 1924) was a Flemish writer.

He studied at the school for teachers Lier and became a teacher in Antwerp. Later he became an inspector of the Catholic primary schools and a teacher at the school for teachers in Mechelen.

As a writer he wrote poems which reflected his strict catholic belief. He is best known for the epic Het menschdom verlost (first edition 1872) (E: Humanity saved), written in Alexandrine verse. He also wrote the libretto of the oratorio Fransciscus of Edgar Tinel.

At the frontwall of his house in the Sint-Martinusstraat (nr. 8) in Retie, there was, in earlier days, a stone with the engraving Hier leefde en stierf dichter Lodewijk De Koninck 1924 (e: Here lived and died the writer Lodewijk De Koninck 1924).

Bibliography
 Heibloemen (1869)
 Het menschdom verlost. Tafereelen (1874)
 Galerij van vaderlandsche tafereelen, opgehangen rond de wieg van P.P. Rubens (1878)
 Ode aan Vondel (1879)
 Verspreide gedichten (1880)
 Ode aan Kiliaan (1882)
 Het menschdom verlost (1883)
 Het menschdom verlost. Heldendicht in twaalf zangen (1883)
 Karelslied (1884)
 Hulde aan (...) Edgard Tinel (1885)
 Franciscus (1887)
 Kerk en Paus (1887)
 Diest en de H. Joannes Berchmans (1888)
 De wonderkerk van Hakendover (1896)
 Het Heilig Bloed van Hoogstraten (1902)
 Lofdicht over het Heilig Sacrament (1902)

See also
 Flemish literature

Sources
 Lodewijk de Koninck
 Lodewijk de Koninck
 G.J. van Bork en P.J. Verkruijsse, De Nederlandse en Vlaamse auteurs (1985)

1838 births
1924 deaths
Flemish writers
Belgian Roman Catholics
Roman Catholic writers
People from Hoogstraten